Tuan Guru Haji Ahmad (born Ahmad Syafi'i;  – ) was an Indonesian ulama, teacher, and trader, who was known as the first ulama in Bengkalis Regency.

Life and career 
Tuan Guru Haji Ahmad was born Ahmad Syafi'i in Kuok, one of the villages in Kampar Regency, Dutch East Indies, to Muhammad Ali and his wife.

In the early of 20th century, Ahmad came to Bengkalis with his friends in order for trading commodity goods. This trading activity takes place until 1914, when he moved to Kedah, British Malaya, in order to pursue his education by studying at one of the boarding school there.

After studying in Kedah for seven years, Ahmad moved to Mecca in order to perform the Hajj. During this trip, he traveled to several countries in order to increasing his food supplies.

After performed the Hajj, Ahmad stayed in Mecca and continued his study there for three years. After completed his study, Ahmad then moved to Perak, British Malaya, where he married his first wife, Rohimah binti Sani, whom gave him fifteen children. He spends his time by teaching at several Islamic boarding schools in there.

In 1924, Ahmad came back to live in Bengkalis. He then established a boarding school with a madrasa system at Parit Bangkong Mosque in Parit Bangkong, Bengkalis. He also established Parit Bangkong Grand Mosque, which was known as the first grand mosque in Bengkalis. Ahmad then continued to teaching various Islamic knowledge there such as tafsir, fiqh, tawhid, arabic grammar, tarikh, etc, along with his students such as Abdullah Nur and Zakaria bin Muhammad Amin, who later became his son in law by married his daughter, Mariah binti Ahmad, in 1933.

In 1930, Ahmad's family from Perak came to Bengkalis to live with him. He then preaching and teaching Islam at several mosque in Bengkalis, where he later married his second wife, Khadijah binti Sulaiman, whom gave him five son. During this period, he often received death threats from the local. Ahmad then established Al-Muttaqin mosque in Pangkalan Batang, Bengkalis District.

In 1937, along with his son in law Zakaria bin Muhammad Amin, he established Al-Khairiyah boarding school. This school was the first Islamic boarding school in Bengkalis, who was reportedly successful due to multitude students came from various regions in Riau, to study there. Ahmad continued to teaching and preaching at Al-Khairiyah along with six of his students namely Abdullah Nur, Zakaria bin Muhammad Amin, Muhammad Sidik, Muhammad Toha, Ismail, and Umar. Al-Khairiyah was closed due to the Japanese occupation of the Dutch East Indies.  

During Japanese occupation, many religious figure in Bengkalis were murdered. Ahmad decided to moved back to Perak along with his family, until the proclamation of Indonesian independence, where he moved back to Bengkalis, and continued his preaching and teaching activity.

Death and legacy 

Ahmad died in Bengkalis, Riau. He was buried in Pangkalan Batang.

On October 23, 2017, his name remained as the name of the Bengkalis Area Library and Archive Building, which has been established from February 11, 2013.

Citations

References 

1885 births
1949 deaths
Indonesian educators
Indonesian imams
People from Riau